Lebanon is a home rule-class city and the county seat of Marion County, Kentucky, in the United States. The population was 5,539 at the 2010 census. Lebanon is located in central Kentucky, southeast of Louisville. A national cemetery is located nearby.

Lebanon is renowned for its Ham Days Festival and Tractor Show which is held during the last weekend of September. In the 1960s and early 1970s, it was known as an entertainment hotspot, as nationally known acts appeared at Club 68 and the Golden Horseshoe nightclubs.

Geography
Lebanon is located at  (37.570623, -85.256263). It is located at the junction of US 68 and Ky. 55, Ky. 52, and Ky. 49. Ky. 84 intersects Ky. 49 and 52 just west of town.

Demographics

As of the census of 2000, there were 5,718 people, 2,332 households, and 1,476 families residing in the city. The racial makeup of the city was 77.88% White, 19.92% African American, 0.12% Native American, 0.73% Asian, 0.47% from other races, and 0.87% from two or more races. Hispanic or Latino of any race were 1.03% of the population.

There were 2,332 households, out of which 29.5% had children under the age of 18 living with them, 39.5% were married couples living together, 20.2% had a female householder with no husband present, and 36.7% were non-families. 33.1% of all households were made up of individuals, and 16.0% had someone living alone who was 65 years of age or older. The average household size was 2.31 and the average family size was 2.92.

In the city, the population was spread out, with 23.7% under the age of 18, 9.5% from 18 to 24, 26.8% from 25 to 44, 21.5% from 45 to 64, and 18.5% who were 65 years of age or older. The median age was 37 years. For every 100 females, there were 85.4 males. For every 100 females age 18 and over, there were 80.8 males.

The median income for a household in the city was $21,860, and the median income for a family was $26,552. Males had a median income of $25,889 versus $18,680 for females. The per capita income for the city was $14,311. About 26.7% of families and 30.3% of the population were below the poverty line, including 42.8% of those under age 18 and 20.9% of those age 65 or over.

History

In historical context, it is important to note that prior to the establishment of the city now known as Lebanon, the nearby town of Georgetown was also named "Lebanon" during its first few years of establishment. It was renamed in 1790 in honor of President George Washington.

Present-day Lebanon was established in 1814 and named for the Biblical Lebanon because of its abundant cedar trees. The founding community traces back to the Hardin's Creek Meeting House, built by Presbyterians from Virginia. It was incorporated as a city on January 28, 1815, and became the county seat of Marion County in 1835. Because of its style, architecture, and businesses, Lebanon had the reputation of being Kentucky's Philadelphia and was considered for the site of the state capitol.

In the 19th century, Lebanon was one of the stops along the National Turnpike from Maysville to Nashville. In 1819, Henry Clay and Andrew Jackson met here after having crossed paths on their journeys. Many of its brick homes date from the antebellum period, including Hollyhill and Myrtledene Bed and Breakfast. Much of Lebanon's downtown business district was recently placed on the National Historic Register.

A branch of the Louisville & Nashville Railroad was built to Lebanon in 1857, but growth of the town was halted by the Civil War. Three battles were fought nearby, and control over the railroad branch passed between Union and Confederate hands several times. After the death of his brother Tom during a local battle, Confederate John Hunt Morgan's cavalry burned the railroad depot, a hotel, and several residences on July 5, 1863 during the Battle of Lebanon.

Lebanon's Historic Homes and Landmarks Tour is also part of the Kentucky's Civil War Heritage Trail and includes twenty-four listings. On the Civil War Discovery Trail, three landmarks stand out. The Commissary Building, which is the old Sunnyside Dispensary Building, was in place during the Civil War and supplied dry goods and food stuffs to the Union Garrison here. The Shuck building, which is now Henning's Restaurant, was the office of General George H. Thomas, when he gathered an army of several thousand to go to Mill Springs to defend the Cumberland Valley. Myrtledene Bed and Breakfast was where General John Hunt Morgan rode his horse in the house and started up the stairs. General Morgan used the property as his headquarters while he was in Lebanon. On the southern limits of Lebanon is the National Cemetery, where many of the Union Soldiers who fell in the 1862 Battle of Perryville were laid to rest. The cemetery is the site of many military funerals and hosts annual Memorial Day celebrations.

The town rebounded after the war and became a trade center, but declined as railroads became less important to commerce in the 1900s. The tracks were abandoned, then eventually removed by CSX Transportation in the mid-1980s.

In the 1950s, 1960s, and early 1970s, Lebanon was known as an entertainment hotspot, as nationally known acts appeared at The Plantation, Club Cherry, Club 68, and the Golden Horseshoe nightclubs. The clubs hosted famous acts such as Ike and Tina Turner, Nat King Cole, Jerry Lee Lewis, Creedence Clearwater Revival, Steppenwolf, The Platters, the Amazing Rhythm Aces, Otis Redding, Jimi Hendrix, Little Richard, Bo Diddley, Jackie Wilson, The Supremes, Ray Charles, James Brown, Chuck Berry, Fats Domino, Sam and Dave, Wilson Pickett, B.B. King, Percy Sledge, Bobby Blue Bland and Count Basie.

Education
Lebanon has a lending library, the Marion County Public Library.

School sports
In 1993, the Marion County High School men's basketball team won the KHSAA Boy's State Championship.

In 2013, the Marion County High School women's basketball team won the KHSAA Girl's State Championship. Makayla Epps also won the Herald-Leader trophy for Most Valuable Player in the game. The women's team also had an undefeated season in 2013, going 39–0. They are one of three teams in KHSAA to have an undefeated season.

In 2016, Joe Keith Bickett published "The Origins of the Cornbread Mafia"

In 2017, the Marion County High School boys baseball team made it to the semi-finals for the first time in school history.

Arts and culture 
In 1969, the Marion County Chamber of Commerce hosts the first ever Marion County Country Ham Days.

Economy
Diageo built a $130 million distillery in Lebanon in 2020, the distillery has 30 full-time employees.

Portrayal in media 
A silent documentary, Our Day, was directed by Wallace Kelly in 1938, about a day in the life of the Kelly family in Lebanon.

Call of the Wildman, an American reality television series that airs on the Animal Planet network films near Lebanon.

Notable people
Walter Noble Burns Western fiction writer
Frank Chelf, U.S. Representative from Kentucky; 1945–1967
George Elder, Major League baseball player
John Grim, Major League baseball player
Jimmy Higdon, Kentucky state senator since 2009; state representative, 2003–2009; native of Lebanon, local businessman
J. Proctor Knott, U.S. Representative from Kentucky; 29th Governor of Kentucky 1883–1887.
Sam B. Thomas, Democrat who served as member of the Kentucky House of Representatives from District 24, 1972–1986
James E. Whitlock, Democrat who represented the 29th District in the Kentucky House, 1962–1967
Ernie "Turtleman" Brown, Reality TV star of "Call of the Wildman" on Animal Planet
Thomas A. Spragens, Former President of Centre College, Danville, KY (1957-1981)

References

External links

Cities in Kentucky
Cities in Marion County, Kentucky
County seats in Kentucky